Le Huron (The Huron) is a French opéra comique in two acts by André Grétry. The libretto is by Jean-François Marmontel based on the story L'Ingénu (1767) by Voltaire. It was the composer's first big success with Parisian audiences.

Performance history
It was first performed on 20 August 1768 by the Comédie-Italienne at the Hôtel de Bourgogne in Paris.

It was revived in 2010 and 2011:
 12 December 2010, Bourgueil Abbey (France), conductor: Julien Dubruque (concert version)
 1 November 2011, Theatre Adyar (Paris, France), conductor: Julien Dubruque; stage director: Henri Dalem

Roles

Synopsis
The story is set in Brittany and concerns a love affair between a local girl and a man raised by the Huron Indians in America.

Sources

Further reading
The Oxford Dictionary of Opera, by John Warrack and Ewan West (1992), 782 pages,

External links
 

Opéras comiques
Operas by André Grétry
French-language operas
Operas
Operas based on works by Voltaire